The 1981 Giro d'Italia was the 64th running of the Giro. It started in Brescia, on 13 May, with a  prologue and concluded in Verona, on 7 June, with a  individual time trial. A total of 130 riders from thirteen teams entered the 22-stage race, that was won by Italian Giovanni Battaglin of the Inoxpran team. The second and third places were taken by Swede Tommy Prim and Italian Giuseppe Saronni, respectively.

Amongst the other classifications that the race awarded, Gis Gelati-Campagnolo's Saronni won the points classification, Claudio Bortolotto of Santini-Selle Italia won the mountains classification, and Hoonved-Bottecchia's Giuseppe Faraca completed the Giro as the best neo-professional in the general classification, finishing eleventh overall. Bianchi-Piaggio finishing as the winners of the team classification, ranking each of the twenty teams contesting the race by lowest cumulative time. In addition, Bianchi-Piaggio won the team points classification.

Teams

A total of thirteen teams were invited to participate in the 1981 Giro d'Italia. Each team sent a squad of nine riders, which meant that the race started with a peloton of 130 cyclists. From the riders that began this edition, 104 made it to the finish in Verona.

The teams entering the race were:

Route and stages

The route for the 1981 edition of the Giro d'Italia was revealed to the public by head organizer Vincenzo Torriani on 21 February 1981. Two of these ten stages had summit finishes: stage 17, to Borno; and stage 20, to Tre Cime di Lavaredo. The organizers chose to include two rest days. When compared to the previous year's race, the race was  shorter and contained one more time trial. In addition, this race contained one more set of split stages.

Classification leadership

Three different jerseys were worn during the 1981 Giro d'Italia. The leader of the general classification – calculated by adding the stage finish times of each rider, and allowing time bonuses for the first three finishers on mass-start stages – wore a pink jersey. The time bonuses for the 1981 Giro were thirty seconds for first, twenty seconds for second, and ten seconds for third place on the stage. This classification is the most important of the race, and its winner is considered as the winner of the Giro.

For the points classification, which awarded a purple (or cyclamen) jersey to its leader, cyclists were given points for finishing a stage in the top 15; additional points could also be won in intermediate sprints. The green jersey was awarded to the mountains classification leader. In this ranking, points were won by reaching the summit of a climb ahead of other cyclists. Each climb was ranked as either first, second or third category, with more points available for higher category climbs. The Cima Coppi, the race's highest point of elevation, awarded more points than the other first category climbs. The Cima Coppi for this Giro was the Tre Cime di Lavaredo. The first rider to cross the Tre Cime di Lavaredo was Swiss rider Beat Breu. The white jersey was worn by the leader of young rider classification, a ranking decided the same way as the general classification, but considering only neo-professional cyclists (in their first three years of professional racing).

Although no jersey was awarded, there was also one classification for the teams, in which the stage finish times of the best three cyclists per team were added; the leading team was the one with the lowest total time. There was another team classification that awarded points to each team based on their riding's finishing position in every stage. The team with the highest total of points was the leader of the classification.

The rows in the following table correspond to the jerseys awarded after that stage was run.

Final standings

General classification

Points classification

Mountains classification

Young rider classification

Traguardi Fiat classification

Team classification

Team points classification

Aftermath

With his Giro victory, Battaglin completed the Vuelta–Giro double, the second rider to achieve the feat (Eddy Merckx was the first in 1973). Only 48 days separated the Vuelta's start on 21 April from the Giro's end on 7 June.

References

Citations

 
Giro d'Italia by year
Giro d'Italia, 1981
Giro d'Italia, 1981
Giro d'Italia
Giro d'Italia
1981 Super Prestige Pernod